Stuart Ronald McKenzie (born 19 September 1967) is an English former professional footballer who played as a defender in the Football League for York City and in non-League football for Bridlington Trinity, Guiseley, Hall Road Rangers, North Ferriby United, Lincoln United, Ossett Town and Brigg Town.

References

1967 births
Living people
Footballers from Kingston upon Hull
English footballers
Association football defenders
York City F.C. players
Bridlington Trinity F.C. players
Guiseley A.F.C. players
Hall Road Rangers F.C. players
North Ferriby United A.F.C. players
Lincoln United F.C. players
Ossett Town F.C. players
Brigg Town F.C. players
English Football League players